Carrie Marcus Neiman (May 3, 1883 – March 6, 1953) was an American businesswoman and one of the co-founders of Neiman Marcus, a luxury department store.

Early life 
Carrie Marcus was born in Louisville, Kentucky to German-Jewish immigrants Delia (Bloomfield) and Jacob Marcus. Jacob was a cotton broker, a fairly common occupation in the South. In 1895 the family moved to Hillsboro, Texas.  Carrie did not receive a formal education but was educated at home in a European milieu, reading German newspapers and studying European fashion magazines. In 1899, she followed her older siblings to Dallas, where she worked as a saleswoman at A. Harris and Company, a local department store, and became a top salesgirl.

She met  Abraham Lincoln "Al" Neiman in Dallas, and they married shortly after, on April 25, 1905. She joined her husband, her brother Herbert, and his wife Minnie in a sales promotion business—the Neiman-Marcus Sales Firm—based in Atlanta, Georgia. Their success brought them a choice: accept a buyout from a local merchant, or promote a new (and risky) product, Coca-Cola. The family sold their business for $25,000 and returned to Dallas in 1907 to start an entirely new type of business.

Neiman Marcus 
In the early 1900s, most women with money went to dressmakers, and many Texans traveled to New York, or even Europe, to find the best seamstresses and the most contemporary styles. Carrie, Al, Herbert, and Minnie wanted to bring fine, ready-made clothing to Texas. Their exact motivations remain unclear, but Carrie's previous experience with department stores, and the group's successful sales business likely influenced their decision.

In 1907, Carrie, Al, and Herman started Neiman Marcus, with the men handling finances and logistics, and Carrie in charge of choosing what goods to sell—a combination of farm goods and readymade fashion. She traveled to New York and Paris to choose garments that met her standards of simplicity and elegance. Carrie was recovering in the hospital from typhoid fever on opening day, but the store was a resounding success from the beginning.

The efforts of the founding families, their employees, and the success of the Texas cotton, cattle and later oil and related industries made Neiman Marcus a continuing and growing success story. Carrie and many others became a part of Dallas and retailing history and she was designated a "symbol of elegance" by Holiday (magazine).

The store carried many goods that were not available anywhere else in the United States, combined with their devotion to tracking down the perfect piece for their customers, led Carrie to develop a branch of the store devoted to long-distance orders.

In 1928 Carrie's husband's continued infidelity (including with a buyer for Neiman Marcus) brought about their divorce and a full buyout of the store by her brother Herbert Marcus and the Marcus clan. She began hosting fashion shows in the stores during the 1930s,  and established the Neiman Marcus Fashion Award for outstanding fashion designers in 1938, elevating the store's status to an arbiter of couture. During World War II, Carrie pushed designers to create fashions that aligned with the rationing of certain materials, including nylon and other fabrics.

In 1950, her brother Herbert died and she became the chairman of the board of directors. Carrie believed that the store's location in Dallas was a core part of the Neiman Marcus identity, and refused to consider stores outside Dallas for a long time, as she hoped the store would bring tourists to Dallas. She eventually approved of the Preston Road Neiman Marcus branch store—the first store outside of Downtown Dallas—before her death in 1953.  Stanley Marcus , who had been the leader of the Store for many years,  became President at the death of his father, Herbert. Carrie Neiman was greatly revered and participated in all major store decisions, remained arbiter of style and taste to her large base of “ good customers “ up until her death. She died in 1953 of complications from pleurisy.

She, her husband and her family figure prominently in the History of the Jews in Dallas, Texas, including in the establishment of the Columbian Club, started because Jews were not welcome in other Dallas clubs. Herbert  Marcus and Al Neiman were also early members of Lakewood Country Club and Carrie used both Columbian and Lakewood to entertain long after she divorced Al. Stanley Marcus and his brothers established the Carrie Marcus Neiman Fashion Collection in 1960. The Collection is now at the University of North Texas, included in the Texas Fashion Collection. Which, if any of the garments were actually owned by Carrie Neiman is not known.

References

1883 births
1953 deaths
American people of German-Jewish descent
American businesspeople in retailing
Jews and Judaism in Dallas
Businesspeople from Louisville, Kentucky
People from Hillsboro, Texas
20th-century American businesspeople